Ostoja Stjepanović (born 17 January 1985) is a Macedonian retired professional footballer who played as a midfielder.

Club career
Stjepanović agreed to join the Partizan youth system from Makedonija Gjorče Petrov at age 16. He would make his senior debut on loan at Teleoptik in 2003. After spending two seasons with the Serbian League Belgrade side, Stjepanović was sent out on loan to Bosnian club Slavija Sarajevo for the 2005–06 season.

In early 2009, Stjepanović moved to Austria and signed with SV Mattersburg. He spent one and a half seasons with the Bundesliga club. From March to June 2011, Stjepanović played for Kazakhstan Premier League side Taraz.

In August 2011, Stjepanović returned to his homeland and rejoined Vardar. He helped the club win back-to-back championship titles in 2012 and 2013, contributing with five goals in 57 appearances. In July 2013, Stjepanović signed a two-year contract with Polish club Wisła Kraków.

International career
Stjepanović was capped for Macedonia at under-17 and under-19 levels. He made his full international debut for Macedonia on 14 November 2012, coming on as a substitute in a 3–2 home friendly victory over Slovenia. As of April 2020, he has earned 18 caps, scoring no goals.

Honours
Vardar
 Macedonian First League: 2011–12, 2012–13
 Macedonian Cup: 2006–07

Notes

References

External links

 
 
 
 
 
 

1985 births
Living people
Footballers from Skopje
Macedonian people of Serbian descent
Association football midfielders
Macedonian footballers
North Macedonia youth international footballers
North Macedonia international footballers
FK Teleoptik players
FK Makedonija Gjorče Petrov players
FK Slavija Sarajevo players
FK Dinamo Vranje players
FK Vardar players
FK Čukarički players
SV Mattersburg players
FC Taraz players
Wisła Kraków players
OFK Beograd players
AEL Limassol players
Śląsk Wrocław players
FK Rabotnički players
FK Rad players
Macedonian Second Football League players
Premier League of Bosnia and Herzegovina players
Serbian First League players
Macedonian First Football League players
Serbian SuperLiga players
Austrian Football Bundesliga players
Kazakhstan Premier League players
Ekstraklasa players
Cypriot First Division players
Macedonian expatriate footballers
Expatriate footballers in Bosnia and Herzegovina
Macedonian expatriate sportspeople in Bosnia and Herzegovina
Expatriate footballers in Serbia
Macedonian expatriate sportspeople in Serbia
Expatriate footballers in Austria
Macedonian expatriate sportspeople in Austria
Expatriate footballers in Kazakhstan
Macedonian expatriate sportspeople in Kazakhstan
Expatriate footballers in Poland
Macedonian expatriate sportspeople in Poland
Expatriate footballers in Cyprus
Macedonian expatriate sportspeople in Cyprus